Alice Pashkus (1911–1972) was born on February 21, 1911, in Germany. According to Jon Verbalis, she had piano tuition from Elie Robert Schmitz. She studied medicine but after meeting Theodore Pashkus, she dedicated herself to instrumental (mostly violin and piano) pedagogy. Her most influential work was carried out in collaboration with her husband Theodore. For many years the couple were very much in demand as specialists in  musicians' physical as well as psychological problems. Among their most famous clients were Ossy Renardy, Yehudi Menuhin, Ivry Gitlis, Michèle Auclair, Franco Gulli and Enzo Porta. Alice Pashkus also gave instruction to the pianists Yorgos Manessis and Jon Verbalis.

References

Further reading 
 Elie Robert Schmitz, The Capture of Inspiration, New York, E. Weyhe, 1935
 Menuhin, Yehudi, Voyage inachevé-autobiographie, Paris, Seuil, 1976
 Ivry Gitlis, L’Âme et la Corde, Paris, Robert Laffont, 1980
 Enzo Porta, Il Violino nella Storia, Maestri, Tecniche, Scuole, Torino, EDT, 2000
 Philippe Borer (editor), La Pagina e l'Archetto, bibliografia violinistica storico-tecnica e studi effettuati su Niccolò Paganini, Genova, Comune di Genova, 2003  
 Jon Verbalis, Natural Fingering: A Topographical Approach to Pianism, New York, Oxford University press, 2012

External links 
Profile of Theodore and Alice Pashkus on Rudolf Bruil's 'The Remington Site'
A Greek profile of Alice Pashkus by a student of a student of hers

Violin pedagogues
American music educators
American women music educators
1911 births
1972 deaths
20th-century American violinists
Women violinists
20th-century women musicians
20th-century American women musicians
German emigrants to the United States